Cult is the sixth studio album by American rock band Bayside.

Background
In September 2012, vocalist/guitarist Anthony Raneri said the group was "locking in a new label" and were aiming to being writing their next album in January 2013. The following month, the group released a covers EP as a stop-gap release to tide their fans over until their next album. Between April and June, the group supported Alkaline Trio on their headlining tour of the US. Cult was recorded at The Carriage House in Stamford, Connecticut, Applehead Recording in Woodstock, New York, and Raw Recording in Patterson, New York, with producers Shep Goodman and Aaron Accetta. Goodman and Dan Korneff served as engineers; Chris Sheldon mixed the album, before it was mastered by John Naclerio at Nada Recording Studios.

Release
On August 16, 2013, the group announced they had signed to independent label Hopeless Records. Raneri said they were keen to with a label that "could be our last label. We wanted to be somewhere that was actually emotionally invested in their bands no matter what the bands potential or situation was." In September and October, the group went on a co-headlining US tour with Motion City Soundtrack. They were supported by What's Eating Gilbert and State Champs. Towards the end of the tour, Raneri was forced to leave due to the birth of his child. His position was filled in by various crew members. On November 12, the group posted several black and photo illustrations on their social media profiles. Later that day, Cult was announced for release in February 2014, revealing its track listing and artwork. In addition, a lyric video was released for "Pigsty". In December, the group performed a few shows with Modern Baseball.

On January 27, 2014, a lyric video was released for "Time Has Come". The track was released to radio on February 10. Cult was made available for streaming on February 14, before being released on February 18 through Hopeless Records. On the same day, a music video was released for "Time Has Come". In March and April, the group went on a headlining US tour, dubbed The Great American Cult Tour. They were supported by Four Year Strong, Mixtapes and Daylight. In April, the band supported Alkaline Trio on their headlining UK tour. In October, the group went on a headlining US tour with support from I Am the Avalanche and Seaway. In March and April 2015, the group embarked on an anniversary tour to celebrate 15 years of being a band. They were supported by Senses Fail, Man Overboard and Seaway. In August and September, the group went on tour with The Early November and Better Off.

Reception

The album received generally favorable reviews. The album was included at number 46 on Kerrang!s "The Top 50 Rock Albums Of 2014" list.

Track listing 
All songs written by Bayside, except "Hate Me" by Bayside, Shep Goodman, and Aaron Accetta.

Personnel
Personnel per booklet.

Bayside
 Anthony Raneri – vocals, guitar
 Jack O'Shea – guitar
 Nick Ghanbarian – bass guitar
 Chris Guglielmo – drums

Additional musicians
 Dino Covelli – keys arrangement, string arrangement

Production and design
 Shep Goodman – producer, engineer
 Aaron Accetta – producer
 Dan Korneff – engineer
 Chris Sheldon – mixing
 John Naclerio – mastering
 Ronlewhorn – cover image, illustrations, album layout
 Mia Raneri – cover image
 Nick Ghanbarian – art direction

Chart performance

References

External links

Cult at YouTube (streamed copy where licensed)

Bayside (band) albums
2014 albums
Hopeless Records albums
Albums produced by Aaron Accetta
Albums produced by Shep Goodman